The following is a timeline of WhatsApp,  a proprietary cross-platform, encrypted, instant messaging client for smartphones.

References

WhatsApp
WhatsApp